Bernard John McQuaid (December 15, 1823 – January 18, 1909) was an American prelate of the Catholic Church. He was the first and longest-serving Bishop of Rochester, serving for 40 years from 1868 until his death in 1909. He previously served as the first president of Seton Hall University (1856-1868).

As a bishop, McQuaid was a leading voice of the American church's conservative wing. He publicly clashed with the liberal-minded Archbishop John Ireland and vigorously opposed Americanism.

Early life and education
Bernard McQuaid was born on December 15, 1823, in New York City to Bernard and Mary (née Maguire) McQuaid, who were both natives of Ireland. Shortly after his birth, he moved with his parents to Paulus Hook (later incorporated as Jersey City), where his father worked in a glass factory operated by the brothers George and Phineas C. Dummer. His mother died in 1827, when McQuaid was only three years old. It was in the McQuaid home that Mass was celebrated for the first time in Paulus Hook, performed on November 29, 1829, by Rev. John Conroy, the uncle of future Bishop John J. Conroy.

In 1832, McQuaid's father was killed by a fellow factory worker and eight-year-old Bernard was placed in the Catholic orphanage on Prince Street in Lower Manhattan, staffed by the Sisters of Charity. In 1839, he was discharged from the orphanage and began his preparatory studies for the priesthood at the minor seminary in Chambly, near Montreal. He returned to New York City in 1843 and then entered St. Joseph's Seminary at Fordham (then affiliated with St. John's College, now Fordham University).

As a seminarian, McQuaid suffered from poor health due to tuberculosis. Many years later he recounted that "friends expected to put me under the sod," but he eventually recovered and noted "I have downed them all." In addition to his studies, he served as a tutor at St. John's College (1843-1846).

Priesthood
McQuaid was ordained a priest on January 16, 1848, by Bishop John Hughes at St. Patrick's Old Cathedral. Bishop Hughes initially assigned the new priest to St. Mary's Church on Grand Street in Manhattan, but Hughes' secretary, Rev. James Roosevelt Bayley, believed a country post would be better for McQuaid's health. Thus, McQuaid was instead appointed an assistant pastor to Rev. Louis Senez at St. Vincent's Church in Madison, New Jersey, becoming full pastor a few months later in April 1848.

St. Vincent's parish then covered all of Morris, Sussex, and Warren Counties, as well as parts of Union and Essex. McQuaid bought two horses and carriages to travel through this expansive territory, and celebrated Masses in private homes and hotel ballrooms where there was no church. He erected Assumption Church, the first Catholic church in Morristown, in 1848 followed by St. Rose of Lima Church in Springfield in 1852. In 1849, McQuaid opened the first permanent Catholic parochial school in New Jersey at St. Vincent's in Madison, also fitting the church in Morristown for a school the following year. Of these two accomplishments, he later said, "I feel prouder...that so many years ago I founded and established, and carried along successfully the humble parochial schools of Madison and Morristown than I ever felt at having established Seton Hall College and Seminary."

When the Diocese of Newark was created in 1853, Rev. Bayley became its first bishop and named McQuaid as rector of St. Patrick's Pro-Cathedral in September of that year. In one of his first acts as rector, McQuaid recruited the Sisters of Charity, who had cared for him as a child in New York and had been founded by Bishop Bayley's aunt Elizabeth Ann Seton, to take charge of the orphanage attached to the cathedral. He also played a leading role in establishing the Sisters of Charity of Saint Elizabeth as a diocesan community at Newark in 1859, becoming the Sisters' first superior general.

President of Seton Hall

When Seton Hall College was opened in September 1856, McQuaid served as its first president (1856–1857, 1859–1868). He directed a staff of three other priests and five lay instructors, serving a student body that grew from five to 54 by the end of the college's first year. He returned to St. Patrick's at Newark for two years before resuming his duties as president in July 1859, retaining his role as rector of the cathedral and remaining in those positions until he became a bishop. He also served as professor of rhetoric at the college, and was known as "a rigid disciplinarian [who] insisted on promptness and exactness in every detail." In 1860, McQuaid moved Seton Hall from its original location in Madison to South Orange, which was more accessible to Newark. A large marble mansion on the estate served as a seminary while a new brick building was erected for the college. The cornerstone of the new building was laid in May 1860 and the college was opened the following September with 50 students.

On the Sunday following the Battle of Fort Sumter, McQuaid addressed the congregation at St. Patrick's Cathedral and expressed his support for the Union. The following week, the American flag was raised above the cathedral and McQuaid was invited to address a public meeting at the local courthouse, where he declared that "this glorious Union would be sustained against any enemy, whether in our land or from a foreign country." In the spring of 1864, he volunteered as a chaplain and ministered to the wounded and dying soldiers at Fredericksburg, Virginia, where he was the only Catholic priest. During his service, he allegedly converted a Protestant soldier who witnessed him offering whisky to a fellow soldier.

When the newly ordained Rev. Michael Corrigan joined the faculty of Seton Hall in September 1864, a lasting friendship and partnership began between him and McQuaid, who would become the two most prominent conservative leaders among the American bishops of their time. As one historian described their relationship:

In January 1866, a fire destroyed the seminary building at Seton Hall and McQuaid raised the funds to build the larger Immaculate Conception Seminary, which was ready for occupancy by the following year. In addition to his duties as college president and cathedral rector, McQuaid was appointed vicar general of the Diocese of Newark in September 1866. In his two years as vicar general of Newark, he became "a terror to delinquents" and regularly suspended priests for financial misdeeds, drunkenness, and insubordination.

McQuaid accompanied Bishop Bayley to the Second Plenary Council of Baltimore in October 1866, serving as Bayley's theologian and a member of the Council's committee on bishops, priests, and seminarians.

Bishop of Rochester
On March 3, 1868, McQuaid was appointed the first bishop of the newly created Diocese of Rochester by Pope Pius IX. Archbishop John McCloskey of New York noted in a letter to Archbishop Martin John Spalding of Baltimore that McQuaid had been "determined not to accept, [and] had in this the sympathy and encouragement of his own Bishop, but he has finally yielded to considerations." McQuaid received his episcopal consecration on July 12, 1868, from Archbishop McCloskey, with Bishop Bayley and Bishop Louis de Goesbriand serving as co-consecrators, at St. Patrick's Old Cathedral in New York.

McQuaid formally took charge of the Diocese of Rochester on July 16, 1868, when he was installed in a temporary frame building that had been erected to accommodate Rochester's unfinished St. Patrick's Cathedral. The new diocese consisted of eight counties in western New York (Monroe, Livingston, Wayne, Ontario, Seneca, Cayuga, Yates, and Tompkins) that were separated from the Diocese of Buffalo (with the addition of Steuben, Chemung, Schuyler, and Tioga in 1896). At the beginning of McQuaid's tenure in 1868, the diocese contained 54,500 Catholics, 39 priests, 35 parishes, and 29 missions. In his final year as bishop in 1909, there were 121,000 Catholics, 164 priests, 93 parishes, and 36 missions.

Conflicts with priests
McQuaid's disputes with other clergymen began early in his tenure. In February 1869, he tried to remove Rev. Thomas O'Flaherty from his position as pastor of Holy Family Church in Auburn due to the priest's financial mismanagement of the parish and his subsequent refusal to provide an itemized statement. When O'Flaherty refused the reassignment, McQuaid suspended him. The case received wide publicity, with McQuaid blaming the newspaper editor James McMaster "for a great deal of the wrong judgment towards myself entertained by many Priests in distant parts of the U.S. with regard to my action in O'Flaherty's case." McQuaid only lifted the suspension 23 years later, at the behest of Apostolic Delegate Francesco Satolli, on the sole condition that O'Flaherty not be allowed to resume active ministry within the Diocese of Rochester.

Another prominent conflict involved Rev. Louis Lambert, pastor of St. Mary's Church in Waterloo. In addition to his pastoral work, Lambert edited the Waterloo Catholic Times (1877-1880) and later the New York Freeman's Journal (1895-1910). Although he originally approved of Lambert's work, McQuaid's opinion soured after Lambert's newspaper began to criticize him and other clergymen in Rochester and beyond. Thus, in April 1881, he restricted Lambert's ministry to his own parish. Lambert twice appealed McQuaid's decision to Rome, which upheld the bishop both times. In 1888, McQuaid dismissed Lambert from the diocese but the priest appealed again, which required both men to appear in Rome to present their case. Like the O'Flaherty affair, the Lambert case attracted bad press for McQuaid, who complained to Bishop Richard Gilmour in April 1889, "Here I am like a culprit snarled at by all the cheap Catholic newspapers of America from the Atlantic to the Pacific." Rome's final decision came in January 1890, when it refused to reinstate Lambert at Waterloo and instead required him to accept a new parish from McQuaid. Lambert then served as pastor of Assumption Church in Scottsville until his death in 1910.

Outside of Rochester, McQuaid advised his protégé Michael Corrigan, the Archbishop of New York (1885-1902), during the latter's high-profile conflict with Rev. Edward McGlynn. McGlynn was a social reformer who actively supported Henry George and the "Single Tax" movement, which McQuaid believed ran contrary to the Church's teaching on the right to private property. McQuaid encouraged Corrigan to be "clear, strong and bold, and not afraid" with McGlynn and to prohibit New York Catholics from attending McGlynn's Anti-Poverty Society. Corrigan followed this advice, even excommunicating McGlynn in July 1887.

Constant appeals to Rome from American priests against their bishops led to early discussions of appointing an Apostolic Delegate to the United States in order to settle these disputes. McQuaid opposed this idea from the start, writing to then-Bishop Corrigan in February 1877, "The 'Apostolic Delegate' business is a very serious one, and one destined to make trouble if followed up. Instead of keeping up our own warm love for Rome, it will have a contrary effect. The only reason for the change that I have heard indicated has been to lessen appeals to Rome. Will he lessen them? I doubt it." While visiting Rome in late 1878, McQuaid vowed to "use all judicious efforts with all suitable persons from the Pope down to put a stop to this Delegate arrangement." His efforts succeeded in delaying the appointment of an Apostolic Delegate until 1892, when Francesco Satolli was named to the post and secured the reinstatement of priests like Thomas O'Flaherty and Edward McGlynn.

First Vatican Council

In late 1869, McQuaid arrived in Rome to participate in the First Vatican Council (1869-1870), where he was a strong opponent of papal infallibility. While he did have theological reservations about the doctrine, McQuaid's opposition was primarily based on the expediency of what he described as "this most unnecessary question." In a letter from Rome on April 24, 1870, McQuaid wrote to the rector of Rochester's cathedral:

At the beginning of the Council, McQuaid and a minority of bishops unsuccessfully petitioned Pope Pius IX to not have infallibility proposed to the gathering. A preliminary vote on the decree was held on July 13, 1870, during which McQuaid and 87 other bishops voted against, 451 voted in favor, and 62 voted in favor with conditions. Ahead of the scheduled final vote on July 18, many opponents of infallibility decided not to attend the session rather than cast a negative vote in the presence of Pius IX. Among them was McQuaid, who received permission to return home and departed the same day the decree was passed. At his own cathedral on August 28, McQuaid declared, "I have now no difficulty in accepting the dogma, although to the last I opposed it."

However, despite his public acceptance, his previous opposition was not forgotten. In June 1880, he mentioned to Bishop Michael Corrigan: "Two letters from Cardinal Simeoni indicated clearly that my adhesion to the Vatican Council can be questioned...My last letter to the Cardinal showed him plainly how I stood, but that I would not submit gracefully to the calling in question of my faith and honor at the instigation of unknown assailants."

Catholic education

Since his time as a pastor and college president, McQuaid was particularly dedicated to the cause of Catholic education. As he described in an address in August 1872: "I have ever said that I would rather see the school house without the church than the church without the school house." In his view, the parochial school was a spiritual necessity because "unless children are trained, nurtured, [and] schooled under Catholic influences and teachings, they will be lost to God's Church." Public schools, he believed, were dominated by "the Protestant or the godless."

When McQuaid first arrived in Rochester, the only true parochial schools were attached to five German parishes, which at that time educated 2,000 students. McQuaid was determined to establish a school in every parish and, in September 1871, announced his intention to create a system of tuition-free parochial schools in the diocese, staffed by the Sisters of St. Joseph. At the time of his death in 1909, 53 of the diocese's 93 parishes had their own parochial school with 18,000 total students.

In 1874, McQuaid considered the issue of Catholic education as important enough to deny the Sacrament of Penance to Catholic parents who failed to send their children to available parochial schools; this policy was endorsed by the Holy Office in a letter to American bishops in November 1875. Also beginning in 1874, McQuaid directed all students in Rochester Catholic schools to take the New York Regents Examinations in order to "show to our own people and to others that our schools are as good and better than the state schools, even by their own tests."

McQuaid's dedication to Catholic education also connected to his goal to foster an American-born clergy. On his return from the First Vatican Council in 1870, McQuaid opened a minor seminary for young men with an interest in the priesthood. The minor seminary was first called St. Patrick's but it was officially renamed St. Andrew's in 1879. That same year, McQuaid began planning Rochester's own major seminary. He purchased a site in 1887 and construction began four years later. In September 1893, Saint Bernard's Seminary opened with 39 seminarians and eight faculty members, including Edward Joseph Hanna as professor of dogmatic theology and Andrew Breen as professor of Hebrew and Scripture. McQuaid himself taught homiletics there. Saint Bernard's became a national model and by 1910 had 233 seminarians, second only to St. Mary's Seminary in Baltimore.

Archbishop John Ireland

In the late 19th century, the conservative wing of American Catholic bishops was led by McQuaid, Archbishop Michael Corrigan, and Archbishop Frederick Katzer. Leaders of the liberal faction, meanwhile, included Archbishop John Ireland, Archbishop John J. Keane, and Cardinal James Gibbons. These differences led to many public disputes between McQuaid and Ireland. Their feud became so pitched that when once asked if he would "bury the hatchet" with Ireland, McQuaid responded, "Yes, in his skull!"

One of the early differences between McQuaid and Ireland was the establishment of the Catholic University of America. McQuaid expressed his misgivings about a national Catholic university in 1882, describing the idea as premature. Two years later, however, the Third Plenary Council of Baltimore authorized the establishment of the university. McQuaid's opposition intensified as the planning committee, dominated by Ireland and Keane, proposed a location in Washington, D.C., close to Gibbons in Baltimore. When Corrigan confessed his own lack of trust in the committee to McQuaid, the latter advised him to sever all connections with the project. Unsurprisingly, McQuaid did not attend the 1889 dedication ceremonies and refused to allow collections for the university in his diocese. When the Ancient Order of Hibernians began collecting for an endowed chair at the university, McQuaid said the chair should be called the "Murderers' Chair" because he believed the order was connected to the Molly Maguires. When Keane was removed as the university's rector by Pope Leo XIII in 1896, McQuaid was elated and told Corrigan, "The news from Rome is astounding. The failure of the University is known in Rome at last...What collapses on every side! Gibbons, Ireland, and Keane!!! They were cock of the walk for a while and dictated to the country and thought to run our dioceses for us."

McQuaid's animosity toward Ireland grew in 1890, when the latter addressed the National Education Association to praise public schools and express his regret for the need for parochial schools. Ireland also expressed his support for the Poughkeepsie plan, under which local school boards controlled parochial schools during school hours while religious instruction occurred outside those hours. McQuaid, a staunch defender of parochial schools, believed the Poughkeepsie plan compromised Catholic values, saying it "weakens and deadens the Catholicity of our schoolrooms." After Ireland implemented the plan at Faribault and Stillwater in Minnesota, McQuaid described Ireland as "the head and front of the new liberalistic party in the American Church" and lamented that "as our arduous work of the last forty years was beginning to bear ample fruit, they arbitrarily upset the whole. If an enemy had done this!"

Tensions between McQuaid and Ireland reached a boiling point in 1894. The death of Bishop Francis McNeirny in January that year left no Catholic on the Board of Regents of the University of the State of New York. Two priests, Sylvester Malone and Louis Lambert, presented themselves as candidates to the New York State Legislature to replace McNeirny. Given his troubled history with Lambert and Malone's liberal views, McQuaid announced his own candidacy, telling Archbishop Corrigan, "All I care about is to defeat these two." At this point, Archbishop Ireland intervened to oppose McQuaid and successfully lobbied New York politicians for Malone's appointment, even encouraging Lambert to withdraw and endorse Malone. Ireland did not stop there, and later that year he actively campaigned for the Republican Party in the 1894 New York state election. The election ended in a Republican victory and the passage of the Blaine Amendment to the Constitution of New York, denying public funding to religious schools.

Ireland's involvement in New York politics enraged McQuaid, who declared that Ireland "has no sense of the propriety of things." A few weeks after the election, on November 25, McQuaid delivered a sermon at the Rochester cathedral and denounced Ireland, describing his actions as "undignified, disgraceful to his episcopal office" and saying "this scandal deserves rebuke as public as the offense committed." After this public condemnation, McQuaid proudly told Corrigan, "It seems that Ireland and Keane were at Atlantic City the Sunday my sermon was delivered. They were hopping mad, and took no pains to conceal their anger." Rome was also upset by the sermon. In a letter to Cardinal Mieczysław Halka-Ledóchowski explaining his actions, McQuaid declared:

McQuaid's opinion was vindicated by Rome in January 1899, when Pope Leo XIII issued Testem benevolentiae nostrae and condemned "Americanism" as a form of Modernism that was undermining Catholic doctrine to adapt the Church to Protestant culture. Ireland and other liberals claimed that they held no such views. In response, McQuaid took to his cathedral pulpit again on June 25, 1899, criticizing attempts to minimize the issue and insisting that "there was a species of Americanism which the Holy Father had condemned prior to his encyclical." In his sermon, he pointed to four examples: 1) the participation of Ireland, Keane, and Gibbons at the 1893 Parliament of the World's Religions, which put Catholicism on par with the "lowest forms of evangelicalism and infidelity"; 2) their support for the Poughkeepsie plan and "godless public schools"; 3) their support for a more open policy toward "secret organizations" and their "hope that soon the ban would be raised from Freemasonry"; and 4) Keane's lecture at Harvard University in 1890 "to advertise...the new born liberalism of the Catholic Church."

McQuaid's hardline views began to mellow in his later years, especially after the death of his friend Archbishop Corrigan in May 1902. He even managed to reconcile with Ireland, who wrote of his shock at the new situation in December 1902: "McQuaid, too, is my staunch admirer. Le monde est a rebours [The world is upside down]."

O-Neh-Da Vineyard
In 1872, McQuaid purchased a farm overlooking Hemlock Lake and dedicated a portion of the land for use as a winery to produce sacramental wine for local churches, naming it "O-Neh-Da" after the Seneca name for the lake. The winery was producing 20,000 gallons of wine annually by 1905, and it remains in operation to this day. McQuaid made Hemlock Lake his second home and hosted such guests as Archbishop John Joseph Williams of Boston, who spent his summers there until his death in 1907.

Later life and death

A bout with pneumonia led McQuaid to spend a prolonged period of convalescence in Savannah, Georgia, from 1903 to 1904. In February 1904, at age 81, he wrote to Rome to request an auxiliary bishop in the person of Rev. Thomas F. Hickey, the vicar general of the diocese and rector of the cathedral. Rome insisted on appointing a coadjutor bishop with the right of succession, and Hickey was thus consecrated on May 24, 1905.

In 1907, Archbishop Patrick William Riordan of San Francisco also sought a coadjutor bishop and his preferred candidate was Rev. Edward Joseph Hanna, a theology professor at St. Bernard's Seminary. However, Hanna's candidacy was derailed after Cardinal Girolamo Maria Gotti received a letter challenging Hanna's orthodoxy and accusing him of Modernism. Convinced of Hanna's orthodoxy and concerned for his seminary's reputation, McQuaid vigorously defended the professor to Rome: "If this charge had any foundation, it would implicate St. Bernard's Seminary and myself. I know my professors well, as I am constantly with them, and I am sure that there is no tinge of unsoundness in their speech and thoughts." McQuaid was shocked to learn the accusations against Hanna came from St. Bernard's professor of Scripture, Rev. Andrew Breen, whom McQuaid then dismissed from the seminary. Hanna was eventually appointed auxiliary bishop of San Francisco in 1912, becoming archbishop in 1915.

In McQuaid's last months, he received well wishes even from former enemies. Archbishop Ireland sent a telegram offering his "most sincere sympathy" to "the old hero" and Rev. Louis Lambert paid a visit to the ailing bishop.

McQuaid died at his residence in Rochester on January 18, 1909, two days after the 61st anniversary of his priestly ordination. Following his death, the bell of St. Patrick's Cathedral tolled 86 times, one for each year of his life. McQuaid is buried at Holy Sepulchre Cemetery, which he himself founded in 1871.

References

Sources
 
 
 
 
 
 

1823 births
1909 deaths
20th-century Roman Catholic bishops in the United States
American chaplains
Union Army chaplains
Seton Hall University people
Saint Joseph's Seminary (Dunwoodie) alumni
19th-century American Roman Catholic priests